Serhiy Haiduchenko (born 6 June 1989) is a Ukrainian former professional ice hockey goaltender. His career lasted from 2006 until 2018, mainly spent in the Kontinental Hockey League (KHL). He was also selected by the Florida Panthers in the 2007 NHL Entry Draft, though never played in North America. Internationally Gaiduchenko played for Ukraine in two World Championships, in 2014 and 2018, both at the Division I level.

Early career 
Haiduchenko began his career in Kyiv, playing for the junior team at the Ldinka Hockey School. His first coach was Anatolii Donika, a successful former defenseman of the team Sokil Kyiv. Scouts from Yaroslavl took notice of his play, and invited him to move there and join the organization. He was selected by the Florida Panthers, 202nd overall in the 2007 NHL Entry Draft, after a junior career within Lokomotiv Yaroslavl.

International Play 

The Ukrainian national team approached Haiduchenko to join early in his career, but he declined, instead hoping to play for the Russian national team. However, due to IIHF rules concerning changing nationality, he did not qualify to play for the Russian team until after 24 June 2008. He played with the Russian Under-18 squad in two non-IIHF events prior to this date, however, since becoming eligible he has not played for Russia. He held negotiations to play for the Ukrainian team in 2011 but still withheld. In 2014, he finally joined the team, making his full senior international debut playing in the 2014 IIHF World Championship Division I.

Career statistics

Regular season and playoffs

International

References

External links 

1989 births
HC CSKA Moscow players
HC Kuban players
HC Sibir Novosibirsk players
Florida Panthers draft picks
Living people
Lokomotiv Yaroslavl players
KHL Medveščak Zagreb players
Metallurg Novokuznetsk players
Sportspeople from Kyiv
Ukrainian ice hockey goaltenders